Performance management work (PMW) describes all activities that are necessary to ensure that performance requirements of application systems (AS) can be met. Therefore, PMW integrates software performance engineering (SPE) and application performance management (APM) activities. SPE and APM are part of different lifecycle phases of an AS, namely systems development and IT operations. PMW supports a comprehensive coordination of all SPE and APM activities, which is inevitable due to an increased complexity of AS architectures.

The term "performance management work" was first introduced by Brunnert et al. (2014) in Business & Information Systems Engineering as well as in the German WIRTSCHAFTSINFORMATIK.

Context 
The dependency on AS increases in many areas, such as in critical infrastructures like traffic control or power supply. Therefore, AS have to meet growing functional and non-functional requirements. An essential non-functional quality factor is called performance, which is described by the metrics response times, resource usage and throughput. Such metrics are used to define performance goals. In order to ensure performance of AS, these metrics have to be constantly measured and assessed.

Guaranteeing appropriate performance is a major challenge since AS have evolved to complex system of systems. Furthermore, different subsystems of AS undergo a continuous life cycle and lie within the responsibility of different organizations. The resulting complexity requires new approaches for performance management of such system of systems architectures with a multilateral IT governance. Existing approaches such as SPE or APM focus on certain stages of a life cycle. However, a comprehensive approach is missing, which not only addresses the complexity of systems and organizations but also integrates their life cycles.

Framework 

System architectures used to be monolithic consisting of one large single construct. They have progressed to distributed architectures and further to system of systems architectures. An interrelation between system of systems architectures and IT governance is the allocation of several systems to different organizations or organizational units. Similarly to the expansion of system architecture, the former unilateral IT governance becomes a multilateral IT governance with special needs for organizational integration.

The subsystem lifecycle is an iterative process from system development to IT operations, whereas both parts involve different goals. The system development (Dev) is responsible for implementing new features and functionalities to cover functional requirements. In contrast, an IT operations (Ops) team monitors AS and ensures its maintenance and stable state. Traditional SPE activities support Dev teams to meet non-functional requirements such as response times or scalability. In doing so, performance goals and metrics can be defined and measured through load testing. A method to achieve performance goals at an early stage of development are performance models. They can be created using design models and are applied as input for simulation engines and analytical solvers. Traditional APM activities support Ops teams to ensure performance goals mainly by meeting service level agreements (SLA). APM activities have to ensure that sufficient capacity is available to ensure that performance goals can be met. Furthermore, APM activities help to evaluate changes in one or several subsystems. Nowadays, DevOps concepts try to better integrate activities in both life cycle phases. Communication as well as collaboration between both parts support that performance goals can be met. Similarly, SPE and APM activities must be integrated as well.

PMW combines SPE and APM activities. By exchanging performance metrics and goals, Dev teams are able to receive information about performance from Ops and vice versa. For instance, Dev teams can use performance information from Ops to enhance performance models. Consequently, they are able to simulate and predict metrics as well as detect bottlenecks more precisely. As a result, performance issues can be eliminated more efficiently. These improved capabilities lead to higher quality Dev deliverables and, thus, support Ops as well. PMW also implies an integration of the three perspectives System Lifecycle, System Architecture and IT-Governance. PMW activities have to be allocated to organizational units. For that purpose, Information exchange and communication principles have to be established in order to support PMW activities.

Capabilities 
The integration of PMW activities offers new opportunities. It generates transparency among resource requirements and demands of systems. This leads to a better allocation of hardware, licensing and other costs to organizational units and enables to reduce overall costs. Since these transparencies are also available at an early stage, cross-organizational investments are able to be more cost-efficient. For instance, the choice of cloud or service providers can be more targeted as knowledge about performance metrics allows a better bargaining position.

Furthermore, PMW activities help to evaluate performance in the IT value-added chain of cross-organizational AS. This increased transparency of performance metrics across different subsystems also helps to identify bottlenecks and over- and underutilized resources. As this information helps to allocate resources more efficiently across organizations, it also contributes to reduce energy demands of AS and supports environment-friendly systems and green IT.

References 

Software performance management